Diocese of San Joaquin may refer to:

 Anglican Diocese of San Joaquin (part of the Anglican Church in North America)
 Episcopal Diocese of San Joaquin (part of the Episcopal Church in the United States of America)